The Midas Touch is a 1997 film directed by Peter Manoogian, and starring Trever O'Brien.

Plot

Drama about a 12-year-old boy who fantasises about having enough money to be able to cure his grandmother's serious heart condition. When he finds himself in a haunted house, the mysterious owner 'grants' him one wish - the Midas touch. The boy soon learns that it is more of a curse than a blessing when everything he touches turns into gold.

Genre(s)

Drama, Comedy, Fantasy, Independent Film

Cast

External links

1997 films
Romanian fantasy films
English-language Romanian films
1990s fantasy comedy-drama films
American fantasy comedy-drama films
Films directed by Peter Manoogian
1997 comedy-drama films
1990s English-language films
Romanian comedy-drama films
1990s American films